Big Band Sound is a 1970 compilation album of standards by Jo Stafford. The songs were recorded between 1960 and 1970 and see Stafford backed by a number of big band arrangers, notably her husband Paul Weston, as well as Billy May and Benny Carter. The album was released on the Corinthian label.

Track listing 

 "Love for Sale"
 "I Got It Bad (and That Ain't Good)"
 "Taking a Chance on Love"
 "Early Autumn"
 "Speak Low"
 "Candy"
 "Any Place I Hang My Hat Is Home"
 "Old Devil Moon"
 "Teach Me Tonight" 
 "The Night We Called It a Day" 
 "The One I Love (Belongs to Somebody Else)" 
 "Anything Goes" 
 "What'cha Know Joe?"  
 "Tomorrow Mountain"

Personnel 

 Jo Stafford - vocals
 Paul Weston - arranger
 Billy May - arranger
 Benny Carter - arranger

References 

1970 compilation albums
Jo Stafford compilation albums
Corinthian Records compilation albums